Milkmaid Grand Army is the debut release by the US band Midlake. The EP was originally released in 2001 by the band in a limited edition of 1,000 before they signed to Bella Union.

Track listing
"She Removes Her Spiral Hair" - 3:38
"Paper Gown" - 4:30
"Excited But Not Enough" - 4:18
"I Lost My Bodyweight In The Forest" - 1:18
"Simple" - 3:49
"Roller Skate (Farewell June)" - 3:34
"Golden Hour" - 3:41

References

2001 debut EPs
Midlake albums